Arthur Dorros (born 1950) is an author and illustrator of children's books. He attended Pacific Oaks College and graduated from the University of Wisconsin.

Arthur Dorros was born in Washington, D.C. He is an American author of children's books. He graduated from the University of Wisconsin and learned to speak Spanish while traveling in Latin America. He has also worked as a carpenter, cook, draftsman, photographer and teacher.

Though Dorros says he always loved reading, he only decided to author children's books in his thirties, because he thought "it would be fun to put all those interests together and make children's picture books." Dorros has written many fiction and nonfiction picture books including Abuela, an ALA Notable Book, Julio's Magic, a CLASP Americas Award Commended Title, Feel the Wind, and Ant Cities. He's also received Orbis Pictus, the Parents' Choice, Notable Children's Trade Social Studies Books and the Pura Belpré Honor for his works. Several of his works are bilingual.

He currently lives in Seattle, Washington.

Bibliography
Abuela
Abuelo
Alligator Shoes
Animals Talk
Animal Tracks
Ant Cities
A Tree is Growing
City Chicken
Elephant Families
Feel the Wind
Follow the Water from Brook to Ocean
Isla
Julio's Magic
Magic Secrets
Mama and Me
Numero Uno
Papa and Me
Radio Man/Don Radio
Rain Forest Secrets
Ten Go Tango
The Fungus That Ate My School
This is My House
Tonight is Carnaval
Under the Sun (novel)
What Makes Day and Night
When the Pigs Took Over

References

1950 births
Living people
Artists from Washington, D.C.
American children's writers
American illustrators